Alavijeh (also known as ‘Alavījeh and ‘Alavi) is a city in Mehrdasht District, Najafabad County, Isfahan Province, Iran. At the 2006 census, its population was 5,692 in 1,696 families. Alavijeh has an agricultural market for some products such as peaches, grapes, berries, and almonds, among others.

References

Populated places in Najafabad County

Cities in Isfahan Province

https://www.amar.org.ir/portals/0/deh95/1014030002.pdf

https://alavijeh.ir/